CPME may refer to:

 Cyclopentyl methyl ether, a chemical compound used as a solvent
 Standing Committee of European Doctors (Comité Permanent des Médecins Européens), a medical organization representing all medical doctors in the European Union